is a Japanese entertainer, actress, and sportscaster represented by Sony Music Artists.

Filmography

TV series

Radio series

Video games

References

External links
 

Japanese television personalities
Japanese actresses
1982 births
Living people
People from Aichi Prefecture